Sant'Arpino is a comune (municipality) in the Province of Caserta in the Italian region Campania located about  northwest of Naples and about  southwest of Caserta.

Sant'Arpino borders the following municipalities: Cesa, Frattamaggiore, Frattaminore, Grumo Nevano, Orta di Atella, Sant'Antimo, Succivo.

Sant'Arpino is the vulgarized version of Sant'Elpidio, bishop and patron of the town. The ancient city of Atella was located nearby.

References

Cities and towns in Campania